Law & Policy is a quarterly peer-reviewed academic journal covering law and public policy worldwide. It was established in 1979 as Law & Policy Quarterly, obtaining its current name in 1984. It is published by John Wiley & Sons and the University of Denver and the editor-in-chief is Renée Cramer (Drake University).  According to the Journal Citation Reports, the journal has a 2020 impact factor of 1.432.

References

External links

American law journals
Publications established in 1979
Quarterly journals
Wiley (publisher) academic journals
Academic journals published by universities and colleges of the United States